Fabrizio Piccareta (born 15 November 1965) is an Italian UEFA Pro licensed coach. He is the coach of the Under-19 (Primavera) squad of SPAL. Under the tenure of Paolo Di Canio, he served as both assistant manager, and later caretaker manager following Di Canio's resignation at Swindon Town.

Coaching career

In 2001, Piccareta obtained his UEFA B Licence and went on to coach with Italian lower league outfit Sanremese.

Piccareta left Biancoazzurri in 2005 to take up a position with Serie A giants Internazionale. His role at Inter involved working within the Inter Campus Abroad project. It was a job that took him all over the world coaching in China, Cambodia, Iran, Colombia, Cuba and Slovakia among others. Between 2008 and 2011 Piccareta focused his time coaching fellow coaches and acting as a first team coach at Italian lower league clubs.

In May 2011, Piccareta was named assistant manager to Paolo Di Canio at English lower league club, Swindon Town. Piccareta spoke of sharing footballing philosophies with Di Canio setting out a plan to bring a "strong identity" to Swindon along with an "Italian methodology in training" and that their "kind of football won't be boring for the fans". During their first season in charge of Swindon, Di Canio and Piccareta managed to win the League Two championship and finish runners-up in the 2012 Football League Trophy played at Wembley Stadium.

On 18 February 2013, Paolo Di Canio announced his resignation from Swindon Town, leaving Piccareta in caretaker charge. He oversaw the club's 3–1 win away at promotion rivals Tranmere Rovers but after the game announced himself and the rest of the coaching staff would be leaving the club the following morning.

On 31 March 2013, after Paulo Di Canio was announced as the new head coach of Sunderland, it was confirmed that Piccareta would be following Di Canio to the Stadium of Light. On 31 May 2014 he obtained the UEFA A Licence from the Scottish Football Association course in Largs. In November 2014 he started his UEFA Pro Licence course with the Scottish FA.

On 7 February 2015 Piccareta join Portuguese Second Division club Olhanense in co-management with his fellow Italian Cristiano Bacci. After 3 months the duo saved the Club from the relegation leading them to the 18th place.

In July 2015 Piccareta signed a contract as academy coach of Sampdoria where he stayed one season before signing a contract with the Italian Football Federation as scout for the youth national teams. In August 2016 he signed a contract with the Italian Football Federation as part of the Youth National Teams scouting staff. In December 2016 he obtained the UEFA Pro Licence badge with the Scottish Football Association.

In January 2017 Piccareta signed a contract with the Finnish top flight club FC Inter Turku as assistant head coach.

On 4 August 2017, Piccareta was named as head coach of FC Inter Turku. He was the first Italian to work as head coach in this club. After having successfully completed his first season leading the team to safety in Veikkausliiga, his contract was renewed for another year. During the 2018 season, Piccareta led the club to the Finnish Cup title beating HJK on their home ground. This was the first title for FC Inter since 2009 and has given the club access to the UEFA Europa League qualifiers for the 2019 season.

Two weeks after the cup win, Piccareta gave his resignation to join Roma as their Under 17's head coach.

On 21 July 2021, he signed a two-year contract as the head coach of the Under-19 (Primavera) team of SPAL.

Managerial statistics

References

External links
Profile at the official Swindon Town website

Living people
1965 births
Sportspeople from Genoa
Swindon Town F.C. managers
Italian football managers
English Football League managers
Swindon Town F.C. non-playing staff
Sunderland A.F.C. non-playing staff
FC Inter Turku managers
Italian expatriate football managers
Italian expatriate sportspeople in England
Expatriate football managers in England
Italian expatriate sportspeople in Finland
Expatriate football managers in Finland